Hamletson Dohling is a People's Democratic Front politician from Meghalaya. He has been elected in Meghalaya Legislative Assembly election in 2018 from Mylliem constituency as candidate of People's Democratic Front. He was Minister of Municipal Administration, Urban Affairs, Information Technology and Communication in Conrad Sangma ministry from 2018.

References 

Living people
People's Democratic Front (Meghalaya) politicians
Meghalaya MLAs 2018–2023
Year of birth missing (living people)
People from Shillong
United Democratic Party (Meghalaya) politicians
National People's Party (India) politicians